Inferior may refer to:

 Inferiority complex
 An anatomical term of location
 Inferior angle of the scapula, in the human skeleton
Inferior (book), by Angela Saini
 The Inferior, a 2007 novel by Peadar Ó Guilín

See also
Junior (disambiguation)